The Technological Society is a book on the subject of technique by French philosopher, theologian and sociologist Jacques Ellul. Originally published in French in 1954, it was translated into English in 1964.

On technique 
The central concept defining a technological society is technique. Technique is different from machines, technology, or procedures for attaining an end. "In our technological society, technique is the totality of methods rationally arrived at and having absolute efficiency (for a given stage of development) in every field of human activity."

Summary
Ellul argues that modern society is being dominated by technique, which he defines as a series of means that are established to achieve an end. Technique is ultimately focused on the concept of efficiency. The term "technique" is to be comprehended in its broadest possible meaning as it touches upon virtually all areas of life, including science, automation, but also politics and human relations.

See also
Lewis Mumford – His series of works on technology is referred to and critiqued in The Technological Society.
Ted Kaczynski – Industrial Society and Its Future extensively used Ellul's arguments from The Technological Society.

References

Bibliography

Further reading

 Propaganda: The Formation of Men's Attitudes

1954 non-fiction books
Technology books
English-language books
Books about capitalism
Books in philosophy of technology
Social philosophy literature
Philosophy books
Sociology books